Lochaber is an area of the Highlands of Scotland.

Lochaber can also mean:

Places
 Lochaber, Nova Scotia, in Antigonish County
 North Lochaber, Nova Scotia, in Antigonish County
 South Lochaber, Nova Scotia, in Guysborough County
 West Lochaber, Nova Scotia, in Antigonish County
 Lochaber Mines, Nova Scotia, in the Halifax Regional Municipality
 Lochaber, Quebec, a township
 Lochaber-Partie-Ouest, Quebec, a township

Other 
 Lochaber axe, a Scottish war axe
 "Lochaber", a Scottish folk melody best known as the tune for "Mingulay Boat Song"